Liu Banjiu (8 November 1922 – 29 September 2009), also known by his pen name Lǜyuán was a Chinese translator and poet.

Life
Liu was born in Huangpi District of Wuhan city, Hubei in November 1922. Liu graduated from Fudan University in 1944, where he majored in foreign languages. After graduation, he worked as an English teacher in Sichuan and Wuhan.

Liu started to publish poetry in 1941. Liu joined the Chinese Communist Party in 1949.

After the founding of the Communist State, Liu worked as an editor in the Propaganda Department of the Communist Party of China.

In 1955, Liu suffered political persecution in the counter-revolutionary case of Hu Feng, at the same time, he learned German language by himself.

In 1962, Liu worked in the People's Literature Publishing House as an editor. Liu retired in 1988.

Liu died in Beijing, on September 29, 2009, at the age 87.

Works

Poetry
 It's A New Starting Point
 The Human's Poem
 Another Song

Prose
 Lihuncao
 Feihuafeiwu

Translations
 Essays of Schopenhauer
 The Biography of Hegel
 Faust
 Max und Moritz

Awards
 Faust – Lu Xun Literary Prize (1998)
 The Struga International Poetry Festival – Gold Wreath Award (1998)
 International Poets Pen Club – Gold Award (2003)
 Translators Association of China – Competent Translator (2004)

References

1922 births
2009 deaths
Writers from Wuhan
Fudan University alumni
People's Republic of China translators
People's Republic of China poets
20th-century Chinese translators
21st-century Chinese translators
Poets from Hubei
20th-century Chinese poets